The Disappeared is a Canadian drama film written and directed by author and filmmaker Shandi Mitchell. A story of survival and self-discovery for six men lost at sea in the North Atlantic, it stars Billy Campbell, Shawn Doyle,  Brian Downey, Gary Levert, Ryan Doucette, and Neil Matheson.

The film premiered at the Atlantic Film Festival September 14, 2012.

Plot
After their fishing boat sinks, six men in two small dories find themselves stranded in the middle of the North Atlantic Ocean. They have little food and fresh water. The film follows their physical and mental fatigue as the days pass and they try to get home again.

Cast

Production

Writer and director Shandi Mitchell got the idea for the script after speaking with a 92-year-old former sea captain who had once been lost at sea after his ship went down. Her resulting original script explores both physical and mental struggles of being lost at sea.

The film received support from Telefilm Canada, Film Nova Scotia, the Canada Council for the Arts, and the Nova Scotia Department of Communities, Culture and Heritage. The film was acquired by The Movie Network and Movie Central.

Filming of the movie took place in Lunenburg, Nova Scotia over a span of 15 days, beginning its shoot on September 12, 2011. As a film set at sea, the crew faced the challenge of how to film on water. To overcome this obstacle, a special 5 metre by 7 metre floating barge was built to house the film equipment and crew.  Actors were ferried back and forth on zodiacs to hair and makeup artists as needed.

Actor Billy Campbell told media he found the shoot wasn't too taxing despite being in a row-boat for 15 days.

Awards
On February 23, 2013, Shawn Doyle won Outstanding Performance–male for his performance in The Disappeared. at the 11th Annual ACTRA Awards  in Toronto, February 23, 2013. The Disappeared was also nominated for two Canadian Screen Awards. Zander Rosborough and Allan Scarth were nominated for achievement in overall sound and Scarth, Bob Melanson, Rosborough and Cory Tetford were nominated for achievement in sound editing.

Release

Acquired by Astral's The Movie Network and Corus Entertainment’s Movie Central, The Disappeared received financial support from Telefilm Canada, Film Nova Scotia and the Canadian and Nova Scotia tax credit programs, and was developed with added support from the Canada Council for the Arts and the Nova Scotia Department of Communities, Culture and Heritage.

The film premiered at the Atlantic Film Festival to sold out audiences as the Atlantic Gala on September 14, 2012 at the Oxford Theatre in Halifax. The entire cast was reunited for the premiere.

The Disappeared is available to rent or buy on iTunes, Vimeo On Demand, and Amazon.com.

References

External links 
 
 
 Official Facebook Page

2012 films
Films shot in Nova Scotia
English-language Canadian films
Canadian drama films
Films set in Canada
Films about survivors of seafaring accidents or incidents
2010s English-language films
2010s Canadian films